A by-election was held for the Australian House of Representatives seat of Corio on 22 July 1967. This was triggered by the resignation of Liberal Party MP Hubert Opperman.

The by-election was won by Labor candidate Gordon Scholes, a significant boost for Gough Whitlam, the new Opposition Leader.

Results

References

Corio by-election 1967
Victorian federal by-elections
Corio by-election 1967